Valleywise Behavioral Health Center Maryvale, formerly Abrazo Maryvale Campus, Maryvale Hospital Medical Center and Maryvale Samaritan Medical Center, was an acute care hospital located in Phoenix, Arizona and it closed effective December 18, 2017. Valleywise Health purchased Maryvale from Abrazo in early 2018 and reopened the hospital in April 2019. In 1961, the hospital was opened in the 2010s.

History
Maryvale Hospital opened in 1961. In 1998, Samaritan Health System sold Maryvale Hospital to Vanguard Health Systems. In 2003, Vanguard established Abrazo Health Care as its Arizona subsidiary. In 2013, Vanguard was acquired by Tenet Healthcare. In early 2018 Valleywise Health purchased Maryvale from Abrazo and plans were approved to revive the facility as a behavior health hospital and full service emergency department. The total amount spent to remodel and revitalize Maryvale is around 60 million. After renovations were completed, the hospital was reopened in April 2019  providing much needed emergency and behavioral health services to the community of Maryvale

Services
 Cardiovascular care
 Vascular services
 24-hour emergency care

Accreditations
 Accredited Chest Pain Center by The Society of Chest Pain Centers
 Fully accredited by The Joint Commission JCAHO
 Get With The Guidelines Silver Plus Achievement Award - Stroke care - American Heart Association and American Stroke Association

Hospital rating data
The HealthGrades website contains the clinical quality data for Abrazo Maryvale Campus hospital, as of 2017. For this rating section three different types of data from HealthGrades are presented: clinical quality ratings for sixteen inpatient conditions and procedures, nine patient safety indicators and the percentage of patients giving the hospital as a 9 or 10 (the two highest possible ratings).

For inpatient conditions and procedures, there are three possible ratings: worse than expected, as expected, better than expected.  For this hospital the data for this category is:
Worse than expected - 1
As expected - 13
Better than expected - 2
For patient safety indicators, there are the same three possible ratings. For this hospital safety indicators were rated as:
Worse than expected - 4
As expected - 5
Better than expected - 0
Percentage of patients rating this hospital as a 9 or 10 - 57%
Percentage of patients who on average rank hospitals as a 9 or 10 - 69%

See also
 Valleywise Health
 Joint Commission
 Society of Chest Pain Centers

References

External links
 

Buildings and structures in Phoenix, Arizona
Hospital buildings completed in 1961
Hospitals established in 1961
Hospitals in Arizona
Organizations based in Phoenix, Arizona